The Mie–Grüneisen equation of state is an equation of state that relates the pressure and volume of a solid at a given temperature.  It is used to determine the pressure in a shock-compressed solid.  The Mie–Grüneisen relation is a special form of the Grüneisen model which describes the effect that changing the volume of a crystal lattice has on its vibrational properties.  Several variations of the Mie–Grüneisen equation of state are in use.

The Grüneisen model can be expressed in the form

In that case p0 and e0 are independent of temperature and the values of these quantities can be estimated from the Hugoniot equations. The Mie–Grüneisen equation of state is a special form of the above equation.

History 
Gustav Mie, in 1903, developed an intermolecular potential for deriving high-temperature equations of state of solids.  In 1912, Eduard Grüneisen extended Mie's model to temperatures below the Debye temperature at which quantum effects become important.  Grüneisen's form of the equations is more convenient and has become the usual starting point for deriving Mie–Grüneisen equations of state.

Expressions for the Mie–Grüneisen equation of state 
A temperature-corrected version that is used in computational mechanics has the form

An alternative form is

A rough estimate of the internal energy can be computed using

Parameters for various materials

Derivation of the equation of state 
From Grüneisen's model we have

The Hugoniot equations for the conservation of mass, momentum, and energy are

where ρ0 is the reference density, ρ is the density due to shock compression, pH is the pressure on the Hugoniot, EH is the internal energy per unit mass on the Hugoniot, Us is the shock velocity, and Up is the particle velocity.  From the conservation of mass, we have

Where we defined  , the specific volume (volume per unit mass).
For many materials Us and Up are linearly related, i.e.,  where C0 and s depend on the material.  In that case, we have

The momentum equation can then be written (for the principal Hugoniot where pH0 is zero) as

Similarly, from the energy equation we have

Solving for eH, we have

With these expressions for pH and EH, the Grüneisen model on the Hugoniot becomes

If we assume that  and note that , we get

The above ordinary differential equation can be solved for e0 with the initial condition e0 = 0 when V = V0 (χ = 0).  The exact solution is

where Ei[z] is the exponential integral.  The expression for p0 is

For commonly encountered compression problems, an approximation to the exact solution is a power series solution of the form

and

Substitution into the Grüneisen model gives us the Mie–Grüneisen equation of state

If we assume that the internal energy e0 = 0 when V = V0 we have A = 0.  Similarly, if we assume p0 = 0 when V = V0 we have B = 0.  The Mie–Grüneisen equation of state can then be written as

where E is the internal energy per unit reference volume.  Several forms of this equation of state are possible.

If we take the first-order term and substitute it into equation, we can solve for C to get

Then we get the following expression for p:

This is the commonly used first-order Mie–Grüneisen equation of state.

See also
 Impact (mechanics)
 Shock wave
 Shock (mechanics)
 Shock tube
 Hydrostatic shock
 Viscoplasticity

References 

Continuum mechanics
Solid mechanics
Equations of state